Mateusz Wyjadłowski (born 4 January 2000) is a Polish professional footballer who plays as a midfielder for III liga club Wisła Sandomierz.

References

External links
 
 

2000 births
Living people
Footballers from Kraków
Association football midfielders
Polish footballers
Jagiellonia Białystok players
Garbarnia Kraków players
Puszcza Niepołomice players
Stal Mielec players
Hutnik Nowa Huta players
Motor Lublin players
Ekstraklasa players
I liga players
II liga players